Aquimarina is a strictly aerobic and halophilic bacterial genus from the family of Flavobacteriaceae. Aquimarina can cause diseases in marine eukaryotes.

References

Further reading 
 

Flavobacteria
Bacteria genera
Halophiles